A council is a group of people who come together to consult, deliberate, or make decisions.

Council may also refer to:

People
 Floyd Council (1911–1976), American blues musician
 Walter Council (1882–1943), American college football player and physician
 Council Cargle (1935–2013), American stage and film actor
 Council Julian Dunbar Jr. (1922–2020), American politician
 Council Nedd II (born 1968), Presiding Bishop of the Episcopal Missionary Church
 Council Rudolph (born 1950), former professional American football player

Places
In the United States
 Council, Alaska, an abandoned townsite
 Council Airport, an airport near Council, Alaska
 Council, Georgia, an unincorporated community
 Council, Idaho, a city in Adams County
 Council, North Carolina, site of Carver's Creek Methodist Church
 Council, Virginia, an unincorporated community in Buchanan County
 Council Bay, Wisconsin, an unincorporated community in La Crosse County

Other uses
 Councils, Plenary, various ecclesiastical synods in the Roman Catholic Church
 Council of Aragon, part of the domestic government of the Spanish Empire

See also
 Consul (disambiguation)
 The Council (disambiguation)
 Councillor
 Counsel, a legal advisor
 Privy council